The Cincinnati Terminal Subdivision is a railroad line owned by CSX Transportation in the U.S. states of Kentucky and Ohio the line is part of the CSX Transportation Louisville Division and the Northern Region. There are seven sections to the Cincinnati Terminal Subdivision. The seven sections are as follows:

 Butler St. to Winton Pl. – Hamilton, Ohio to Cincinnati, Ohio (19.1 miles)
 Hamilton to Belt Junction – Hamilton, Ohio (1.5 miles)
(Hamilton Belt Line tracks have been removed).
 NA Tower to CT Junction – Cincinnati, Ohio (6.6 miles)
 RH West to CT Junction – Cincinnati, Ohio (4.8 miles)
 CT Junction to Spring Lake – Cincinnati, Ohio to Covington, Kentucky (9.5 miles)
 NX Cabin to South Latonia – Covington, Kentucky (4.4 miles)
 Melbourne to KC Junction – Melbourne, Kentucky to Covington, Kentucky (12.6 miles)

See also
 List of CSX Transportation lines

References

CSX Transportation lines